Lamprista ortholepida is a moth in the family Lecithoceridae. It was described by Kyu-Tek Park and Sang-Mi Lee in 2013. It is found in Papua New Guinea.

References

Moths described in 2013
Lecithoceridae